Cabin John Creek is a tributary stream of the Potomac River in Montgomery County, Maryland.

History

Early land records in 1715 cite Captain John's Run, now Cabin John Creek. The toponym "Cabin John" is thought to be a corruption of the name "Captain John", but the origin of the name remains unresolved.

Course
The headwaters of the creek originate in the city of Rockville. The Union Arch Bridge carries MacArthur Boulevard and the Washington Aqueduct over the stream about 1/4 mile before the creek flows through a culvert under the Chesapeake and Ohio Canal and empties into the Potomac River near Cabin John, Maryland.

Water pollution
The Cabin John Creek watershed is highly developed, and as a result the water quality in the creek main stem and several tributaries is degraded. Montgomery County Government is implementing a long-term plan to improve water quality throughout the area, including stormwater management and stream restoration projects. As of 2021 the county has installed restoration projects on the Booze Creek and Buck Branch tributaries.

Tributaries of Cabin John Creek
Listed from south to north:
 Booze Creek
 Thomas Branch (also called Beltway Branch and Thomas Run)
 Ken Branch
 Buck Branch
 Congressional Branch
 Snakeden Branch (also called Snake Den Branch)
 Old Farm Creek
 Bogley Branch

See also
Cabin John Parkway
List of Maryland rivers

References

External links
 Friends of Cabin John Creek

Rivers of Montgomery County, Maryland
Tributaries of the Potomac River